Dondușeni is a village in Dondușeni District, in northern Moldova, with a population of 1,695 at the 2004 census.

At the 1930 census, the locality had a population of 1,568. It was part of Plasa Climăuți of Soroca County.

References

Villages of Dondușeni District